Pasiphilodes sayata is a moth in the family Geometridae. It is fendemic to  Borneo. Their habitat consists of subsummit dwarf forests.

Adults are uniform dark brown, with the postmedial and antemedial fasciae only slightly edged paler.

References

Moths described in 1976
Endemic fauna of Borneo
Eupitheciini